Chinna Gollapally is a Panchayat in Ranga Reddy district, Telangana, India. It falls under Shamshabad mandal. Munugala Sudhaker Reddy was the Sarpanch of this Gram Panchayat since 1988.
The Panchayat has four villages:
Chinna Gollapally, Peddha Gollapally, Galwaguda & Anantha Reddy Guda.
Three villages in the Panchayat were given to the Rajiv Gandhi International Airport in 1998.
The Panchayat now has only one Village called Peddha Gollapally.

References

Villages in Ranga Reddy district